My Lover, My Son is a 1970 American-British coproduction drama film directed by John Newland. It tells the story of a mother played by Romy Schneider clinging to her maturing son. The film is based on Edward Grierson's 1952 novel Reputation for a Song.

Plot 
Francesca Anderson leads an unhappy marriage with her husband Robert. Her real attention is dedicated to her son James, who reminds her of her late lover Macer. Francesca is the only one who knows that James is not Robert's, but Macer's son. So Francesca reacts jealously when James falls in love with a girlfriend, Julie.

James intervenes in an argument between his parents, and kills Robert. During James' trial, Francesca gives the crucial testimony in favour of her son, who is found not guilty. To Francesca's discomfort, James escapes his mother's clinging and decides to stay with Julie.

Cast 
Romy Schneider as Francesca Anderson
Donald Houston as Robert
Dennis Waterman as James Anderson
Patricia Brake as Julie
Peter Sallis as Sir Sidney Brent
William Dexter as Parks
Alexandra Bastedo as Cicely Clarkson
Janet Brown as Mrs. Woods
Peter Gilmore as Barman

See also
 List of American films of 1970

External links

Movie Review by Roger Greenspun, The New York Times, May 14, 1970
Catalog record for My Lover, My Son (1970) at the United States Library of Congress

1970 films
British drama films
Films based on British novels
Incest in film
1970 drama films
Metro-Goldwyn-Mayer films
Films directed by John Newland
1970s English-language films
American drama films
1970s American films
1970s British films